Samaleswari Sporting Club was an Indian professional football club from Odisha. In January 2012 it was announced that they were to participate in the 2012 I-League 2nd Division, the then second tier (currently 3rd tier) of football in India.

History
In January 2012 they were officially certified by the All India Football Federation to participate in the I-League 2nd Division. This move would begin a new chapter for Samaleswari Sporting Club as they would officially become professional. After the group stage Samaleswari finished fifth in group A and thus did not qualify for the next round.

References

Football clubs in Odisha
Organizations with year of establishment missing
I-League 2nd Division clubs